St. Peter's Evangelical Lutheran Churchmay refer to:

United States
Saint Peter's Evangelical Lutheran Church (St. Peter, Minnesota), which once had a Wangerin Organ Company organ
 St. Peter's Evangelical Lutheran Church (Lancaster, Ohio), listed on the NRHP in Fairfield County, Ohio
 St. Peter's Evangelical Lutheran Church (Versailles, Ohio), listed on the NRHP in Darke County, Ohio as St. Peter Evangelical Lutheran Church
 St. Peter's Evangelical Lutheran Church (Milwaukee, Wisconsin), listed on the NRHP in Wisconsin